In general, the term credit in the artistic or intellectual sense refers to an acknowledgment of those who contributed to a work, whether through ideas or in a more direct sense.

Credit in the arts

In the creative arts, credits are an acknowledgment of those who participated in the production. They are often shown at the end of movies and on CD jackets. In film, video, television, theater, etc., credits means the list of actors and behind-the-scenes staff who contributed to the production.

Non-fiction
In non-fiction writing, especially academic works, it is generally considered important to give credit to sources of information and ideas. Failure to do so often gives rise to charges of plagiarism, and "piracy" of intellectual rights such as the right to receive a royalty for having written.  In this sense the financial and individual meanings are linked.

Academic papers generally contain a lengthy section of footnotes or citations.  Such detailed crediting of sources provides readers with an opportunity to discover more about the cited material. It also provides a check against misquotation, as it's easy for an attributed quote to be checked when the reference is available.  All of this is thought to improve integrity of the instructional capital conveyed, which may be quite fragile, and easy to misinterpret or to misapply.

In fiction
In fiction writing, authors are generally expected to give credit to those who contributed significantly to a work. Sometimes authors who do not want credit for their work directly may choose to use a pen name. A ghostwriter gives all or some of the credit for his or her writing to someone else.

In computing
In computer software licenses, attribution of credit is sometimes a condition of licensing. For example, original versions of the BSD license controversially required credit to be provided in the advertisement for software that used licensed code, but only if features or use of the licensed software was mentioned in the advertisement.

Software documentation is sometimes licensed under similar terms. For example, the GNU Free Documentation License (GFDL) used by Wikipedia requires that acknowledgments to authors be preserved.

See also
 Acknowledgment (creative arts and sciences)
 Attribution (copyright)
 Billing (filmmaking)
 Byline
 Character generator
 Closing credits
 Digital on-screen graphic (BUG)
 Intellectual property
 Lower third
 Motion picture credits
 Opening credits
 Plagiarism
 Production logo
 Signature block
 Title sequence
 WGA screenwriting credit system

References

Film and video terminology
Writing
Collaboration
Intellectual property law